Ghatagaon, is a developing town in Kendujhar District, Odisha, India. It is famous for Maa Tarini temple.

Geography

Transportation
By road

National Highway 20 passes through Ghatgaon. Buses are always available from many towns of Odisha like Kendujhar, Bhubaneswar, Cuttack, Bhadrak, Jajpur etc. 

By rail

Nearest railway station is Harichandanpur railway station which is 16 km away.

By air

Nearest airport is Biju Patnaik Airport at Bhubaneswar which is 174 km away.

Places of interest

 Maa Tarini Temple: It is the main shrine of Maa Tarini who is regarded as the embodiments of Shakti. She is one of the chief presiding Goddess in Odia culture. Every year thousands of devotees visit the temple to worship Maa Tarini.

References

External links
 Wikimapia
 Satellite map of Ghatgaon
 About Ghatgaon

Villages in Kendujhar district